Henry Albert Canet (17 April 1878 – 25 July 1930) was a male tennis player from France. He competed in the 1912 Summer Olympics in Stockholm, Sweden where he won two bronze medals. In the singles division, he succeeded in beating Norwegian Conrad Langaard, although lost to American opponent Roosevelt Pell.

References

External links
 
 

1878 births
1930 deaths
French male tennis players
Olympic bronze medalists for France
Olympic tennis players of France
Tennis players at the 1912 Summer Olympics
Olympic medalists in tennis
Medalists at the 1912 Summer Olympics
Tennis people from Greater London
British emigrants to France